The 2008 season of Úrvalsdeild was the 97th season of top-tier football in Iceland. The league, also known as Landsbankadeild for sponsoring reasons, has been expanded from 10 teams to 12 teams in 2008.

Teams and venues

Promotion and relegation
Víkingur Reykjavík were relegated from Úrvalsdeild after finishing in 10th place the previous season. Their place was taken by 1. deild champions UMF Grindavík. Due to expansion from 10 to 12 teams, 2nd placed Þróttur Reykjavík and 3rd placed Fjölnir Reykjavík were also promoted.

League table

Results
Each team played every opponent once home and away for a total of 22 matches.

Top goalscorers
Source: ksi.is  
16 goals
  Guðmundur Steinarsson (Keflavík)
14 goals
  Björgólfur Hideaki Takefusa (KR)
12 goals
  Tryggvi Guðmundsson (FH)
11 goals
  Atli Viðar Björnsson (FH)
10 goals
  Gunnar Már Guðmundsson (Fjölnir)
  Helgi Sigurðsson (Valur)
9 goals
  Guðjón Baldvinsson (KR)
  Pétur Georg Markann (Fjölnir)
  Nenad Živanović (Breiðablik)
8 goals
  Ívar Björnsson (Fram)
  Hjörtur Júlíus Hjartarson (Þróttur)

External links
 Official website 

Úrvalsdeild karla (football) seasons
1
Iceland
Iceland